Joop Stokkel (born 11 April 1967 in Aalsmeerderbrug) is a Dutch Paralympian and one of the leading equestrians with a physical challenge, in the world.

Stokkel had an accident at the age of seven causing him to lose his entire right arm and left leg. Despite the injury, he went on to start riding at the age of 15. Primarily a demonstration sport in the Netherlands prior to 1990, he participated in the first international competition in 1991, placing seventh. Stokkel earned the title of overall champion at the 1998 World Riding for Disabled Championships at Hartpury, England.

Stokkel began his athletic career as a swimmer, having first represented the Netherlands at the 1988 Seoul Paralympics, winning two golds and a silver. He later won four Dutch National Championships as well as three golds and two silvers at the 1992 Barcelona Paralympics. He received Dutch Knighthood the same year.

References

External links 
  
 
 

1967 births
Living people
Dutch male equestrians
Dutch dressage riders
Paralympic equestrians of the Netherlands
Paralympic gold medalists for the Netherlands
Paralympic silver medalists for the Netherlands
Paralympic bronze medalists for the Netherlands
Paralympic medalists in equestrian
Equestrians at the 1996 Summer Paralympics
Equestrians at the 2000 Summer Paralympics
Equestrians at the 2004 Summer Paralympics
Medalists at the 1996 Summer Paralympics
Medalists at the 2000 Summer Paralympics
Medalists at the 2004 Summer Paralympics
People from Haarlemmermeer
Sportspeople from North Holland
20th-century Dutch people
21st-century Dutch people